Jackals and Vipers in Envy of Man is a studio album by Canadian hip hop artist Sixtoo. It was released on Ninja Tune in 2007.

Critical reception

Nate Patrin of Pitchfork gave the album a 5.5 out of 10, saying, "Jackals and Vipers in Envy of Man is the kind of vague and incomplete music that, instead of immediately boring and/or frustrating you, has just enough intrigue to serve as what would seem to be reasonably unobtrusive background music." Noel Dix of Exclaim! said, "Sixtoo knows how to create moody landscapes and has managed to transfer them to his updated sound nicely." Jason Randall Smith of Impose described it as "a film score for the darker areas of life: long-standing regrets, ulterior motives, or the need to constantly look over your own shoulder."

On July 30, 2007, the album was included on XLR8Rs "Office Top Ten Album Picks" list.

Track listing

Personnel
Credits adapted from liner notes.

 Sixtoo – production, editing, recording
 Hadji Bakara – additional live programming
 Arlen Thompson – additional live recording
 Jef Neve – improvisational piano takes (4, 13)
 Jeremy Felker – illustration, drawings

References

External links
 
 

2006 albums
Ninja Tune albums
Sixtoo albums